The ACC Trophy was a limited-overs cricket tournament organised by the Asian Cricket Council (ACC). Open only to associate and affiliate members of the International Cricket Council (ICC), it was contested biennially between 1996 and 2012, but has been replaced by the three-division ACC Premier League as the primary limited-overs competition for non-Test-playing ACC members. The finalists of the 2000 and 2006 tournaments qualified for the Asia Cup, where matches had One Day International (ODI) status.

The inaugural edition of the tournament was played in Malaysia in 1996, and featured 12 teams in a single division. The single-division format continued until the 2006 tournament, which featured a record 17 teams. The ACC Trophy was then split into "Elite" (first-grade) and "Challenge" (second-grade) divisions, with the first editions held under this format being the 2008 ACC Trophy Elite and the 2009 ACC Trophy Challenge (the latter tournament was the only one to be held in an odd year). The two-division format continued until the final tournament in 2012, with promotion and relegation between divisions.

Only six teams – Hong Kong, Malaysia, the Maldives, Nepal, Singapore, and the United Arab Emirates – competed in all nine editions of the ACC Trophy, although the Maldives and Singapore were relegated to the "Challenge" tournament at various stages after the introduction of two divisions. The UAE was by far the most successful ACC Trophy team, with five wins (and four consecutive victories from 2000 to 2006). Bangladesh won the first two tournaments, but were rendered ineligible after gaining Test status.

Previous finals

ACC Trophy records

Team records 
Highest total:  510/6 (50 overs) v , 2010
Lowest total:  10 all out (12.1 overs) v , 2006
Most wins: UAE 5, Nepal 2, Bangladesh 2, Hong Kong 1, Afghanistan 1

Individual records 
Most runs in an innings: Arshad Ali  213* (146)
Most runs in a career: Arshad Ali  461
Best batting average: Arshad Ali  153.66
Best bowling in an innings:  Mehboob Alam  7/3 v , 2006
Most wickets in a career: Mehboob Alam  52
Best bowling ave: Kashif Butt  3.00
Most catches by an outfielder (career): Khuram Khan  5
Most wicket-keeping dismissals (career): Mohammad Nadeem  8
Most ACC Trophy appearances:

Best Partnerships 

Note: Records are incomplete.

 Sarfraz Ahmed & Fahad Suleiman for  v  201*
 Rahul Sharma & Khalid Butt for  v  181
 Muhammad Jahangir & Irfan Ahmed for  v  174
 Nowroz Khan & Karim Sadiq for  v  171
 Chaminda Ruwan & Munish Arora for  v  170
 Omer Taj & Muhammad Jahangir for  v  174
 Muhammed Iqbal & Arshad Ali for  v  166
 Rahul Sharma & Khalid Butt for  v  161
 Nadeem Babar & Hammad Saeed for * v  158
 Arshad Ali & Saqib Ali for  v  152

Participating teams 
Legend
 – Champions
 – Runners-up
 – Third place
SF – Semi-finalist
GS – Group stage
Q – Qualified
 — Hosts

 Note: the above table includes results in all top-flight ACC tournaments – the ACC Trophy from 1996 to 2006, and the ACC Trophy Elite from 2008 to 2012,
 Teams in italics no longer compete in ACC Trophy/ACC Trophy Elite matches, either through having gained Test status ( and ), or through having moved to the ICC East Asia-Pacific region (and ).

Champions and runners-up 

Notes:
Bangladesh gained full Test status in 2000 and are no longer eligible to participate in the ACC Trophy.

See also 
Asia Cup
ACC Premier League
ACC Twenty20 Cup

References 

 
Asian Cricket Council competitions